Chavanay is a commune in the Loire department in central France.

Population

Twin towns
Chavanay is twinned with Waldkirch, Germany, since 1994.

See also
Communes of the Loire department

References

Communes of Loire (department)